This article provides information on candidates who stood for the 2006 Tasmanian state election. The election was held on 18 March 2006.

Retiring Members

Labor
 Kathryn Hay MLA (Bass)
 Judy Jackson MLA (Denison)

House of Assembly
Sitting members at the time of the election are shown in bold text. Tickets that elected at least one MHA are highlighted in the relevant colour. Successful candidates are indicated by an asterisk (*).

Bass
Five seats were up for election. The Labor Party was defending two seats. The Liberal Party was defending two seats. The Greens were defending one seat.

Braddon
Five seats were up for election. The Labor Party was defending three seats. The Liberal Party was defending two seats.

Denison
Five seats were up for election. The Labor Party was defending three seats. The Liberal Party was defending one seat. The Greens were defending one seat.

Franklin
Five seats were up for election. The Labor Party was defending three seats. The Liberal Party was defending one seat. The Greens were defending one seat.

Lyons
Five seats were up for election. The Labor Party was defending three seats. The Liberal Party was defending one seat. The Greens were defending one seat.

See also
 Members of the Tasmanian House of Assembly, 2002–2006
 Members of the Tasmanian House of Assembly, 2006–2010

References
Tasmanian Electoral Commission 2006 Election

Candidates for Tasmanian state elections